Mohammed Ayoub Tiouali (born 26 May 1991) is a Bahraini middle-distance runner. He won the bronze medal in the men's 1500 metres at the 2018 Asian Games held in Jakarta, Indonesia.

At the 2015 Asian Athletics Championships held in Wuhan, China, he won the silver medal in the men's 1500 metres event.

References 

Living people
1991 births
Place of birth missing (living people)
Bahraini male middle-distance runners
Athletes (track and field) at the 2018 Asian Games
Medalists at the 2018 Asian Games
Asian Games bronze medalists for Bahrain
Asian Games medalists in athletics (track and field)
20th-century Bahraini people
21st-century Bahraini people